Kreator is a German thrash metal band from Essen, formed in 1982. Their current lineup consists of lead vocalist and rhythm guitarist Miland "Mille" Petrozza, drummer Jürgen "Ventor" Reil, lead guitarist Sami Yli-Sirniö, and bassist Frédéric Leclercq. The band's lineup has changed multiple times over its -year career, most noticeably with their bassists and lead guitarists. Petrozza and Reil are the only two original members left in Kreator, although the latter took a break from the band from 1994 to 1996. Yli-Sirniö has been the lead guitarist of Kreator since 2001, while Leclercq joined in 2019 as the replacement of Christian "Speesy" Giesler, who had been a member of the band since 1994.

To date, Kreator has released fifteen studio albums, two EPs, two live albums and three compilation albums. They gained a large underground fanbase in the international thrash metal community, with their second studio album Pleasure to Kill (1986) regarded as an influential album of the genre. Many of their subsequent albums – including Terrible Certainty (1987), Extreme Aggression (1989) and Coma of Souls (1990) – were also highly acclaimed. Despite being an influential band, as well as one of the first European thrash metal acts to sign to a major label (signing to Epic Records in 1988), Kreator would not achieve mainstream popularity until later albums, including their thirteenth studio album Phantom Antichrist (2012) and its follow-up Gods of Violence (2017), both of which charted highly in many countries, with the latter reaching number one on the German charts. Their fifteenth and latest studio album, Hate Über Alles, was released on 10 June 2022.

The band has achieved worldwide sales of over two million units for combined sales of all their albums, making them one of the best-selling German thrash metal bands of all time. Along with Destruction, Sodom and Tankard, Kreator is one of the "big four" of Teutonic thrash metal, responsible for developing and popularizing the German thrash metal scene as well as pioneering the then-burgeoning death metal and black metal genres during the mid-1980s.

History

Formation and early releases (1982–1987)
The band was formed as Metal Militia in 1982 in Essen, Germany and then Tyrant. Later they used the title Tormentor until 1984, when they changed to the present name Kreator. The original lineup featured lead vocalist/guitarist Mille Petrozza, drummer Jürgen "Ventor" Reil, and bassist Rob Fioretti. Kreator recorded their debut album, Endless Pain (1985), in just ten days. The band hired the late Sodom guitarist Michael Wulf for the album's tour to play lead, while Petrozza switched to rhythm guitar.

Wulf was in the band for a few days but never on the band's second album, Pleasure to Kill (1986), which is widely considered a thrash classic and a big influence on the death metal genre. It would not be until 31 years after its release that Pleasure to Kill entered the German album charts. Produced by Harris Johns (Sodom, Helloween, Voivod), the album showed the band growing in talent and technical ability. The song "Flag of Hate" became a concert standard, and the band became one of the most promising up-and-coming European metal acts. The band started their first tour ever (before the release of Pleasure to Kill, they had only played five gigs total); they played their first shows outside of Germany in the fall of 1986, supporting bands like Destruction and Celtic Frost, and in the spring of 1987, they toured the US for the first time, opening for Voivod on their Killing Technology tour. Kreator's first EP, Flag of Hate, was also released in 1986, and around this time, Jörg "Tritze" Trzebiatowski had joined the band.

Rising popularity (1987–1991)
In 1987, Kreator released their third studio album, Terrible Certainty, which is often considered a high-quality Kreator album as the arrangements on the album were more complex and the tempos more varied. The album featured another hit "Behind the Mirror", and the band's popularity continued to grow and a video for "Toxic Trace" received airplay on MTV. They managed to find enough time and money (coming from the concerts) to finance another EP, Out of the Dark... Into the Light. By this point, Kreator had already graduated to headlining their own tours, as well as playing at theaters and arenas with bands such as Megadeth, Voivod, Overkill, D.R.I. and Holy Terror.

Berlin based independent record label Noise Records licensed Kreator for the territories outside of Europe and Japan to the major label Epic Records in 1988. Their fourth studio album and debut with Epic (for limited territories) Extreme Aggression, recorded in Los Angeles, became a metal hit in Europe upon its release in 1989; however, the album would not enter the German album charts until 28 years after its release. Continuing the Terrible Certainty formula while showing the band still progressing musically, and with better production by the well-regarded Randy Burns (also Megadeth, Possessed, Nuclear Assault, Death, Dark Angel, among others), the album featured the band's first major singles, the title track, "Betrayer" and the radio-only "Love Us or Hate Us", gaining support from the Southern California radio station KNAC, and the video for "Betrayer" receiving airplay on MTV's Headbangers Ball. This – as well as playing with bands like King Diamond, Raven, Coroner, Suicidal Tendencies, Death and Sadus – greatly expanded their popularity outside of Germany.

Also in 1989, German director Thomas Schadt made a documentary about Kreator (focusing on the social aspect of heavy metal in the Ruhr Area) titled Thrash Altenessen (named after the band's hometown, a suburb of Essen). Tritze left Kreator after Extreme Aggression. In 1990, with new guitarist Frank "Blackfire" Gosdzik (also formerly of Sodom), the band released their fifth studio album Coma of Souls, again produced by Burns. The album was not quite as praised as the band's previous few albums (many felt the album was "rushed" and repetitive), but still managed sell and maintain popularity quite well, with the singles "When the Sun Burns Red" and "People of the Lie" becoming hits.

Experimentation (1992–2000)
The early 1990s brought a decline in the popularity of traditional thrash metal. With many other thrash bands such as Metallica, Megadeth and Anthrax changing their style by incorporating more melodic elements into their compositions, Kreator began experimenting with groove metal and industrial metal around this time.

The result was Renewal, released in 1992, which featured heavy death metal and industrial influences. While reaching a newer audience, the band upset many longtime fans, accusing them of "selling out". The band experienced a decline in popularity as the result of the backlash against the album.

The line-up of the band underwent significant changes too. Founding member Roberto Fioretti left the band after the recording of the album and was replaced by Andreas Herz. In 1994, Reil left as well, leaving Petrozza the sole original band member. Reil was replaced by Joe Cangelosi while Herz left the same year and was replaced by Christian Giesler. During this time "Epic Records" dropped the band from the contract making them enter into an agreement with GUN Records. The new lineup released the album Cause for Conflict the same year. The songs bore a heavy influence of such bands as Pantera and Machine Head as well as the partial resemblance of "Renewal".

Gosdzik and Cangelosi left in 1996 and were replaced by Tommy Vetterli (formerly of Coroner). This new line-up saw Reil return. Kreator continued to experiment producing Outcast and Endorama, with ambient and gothic influences, incorporated samples and loops. Petrozza employed different approaches for singing, and the albums retained the groove metal influences. However, the record sales went down and by the end of the 1990s the band reached commercial and critical nadir. Despite that, Mille Petrozza was quoted stating: "For us, success doesn't define in record sales. So all our albums have been successful for us, because we've achieved what we were aiming for...".

Return in style (2001–2009)

In 2001, with new lead guitarist Sami Yli-Sirniö, Kreator released their "comeback" album Violent Revolution, which saw the band returning to their classic thrash metal style. Despite containing a lot of melodic and so called "Gothenburg metal" riffs, Violent Revolution was praised by fans and critics alike and benefited from the 2000s thrash metal revival movement, led by bands like Overkill, Slayer, Megadeth, Exodus and Testament. The tour was extremely successful and introduced Kreator to a younger generation of metal fans. Yli-Sirniö, who lived in Germany, was known to be a good guitar player, so the band recruited him. A live album Live Kreation and live DVD Live Kreation: Revisioned Glory were released in 2003, and a new studio album - emphasizing more on the Gothenburg influences – Enemy of God was released in 2005. This album also saw a special edition re-release in 2006 called Enemy of God: Revisited. In early 2006, Kreator toured North America with Napalm Death, A Perfect Murder, and The Undying. There was a joint headline European tour with Celtic Frost in 2007 with support from Watain, Kreator were to tour 2008 with King Diamond, Leaves' Eyes, and Cellador, however, the tour was canceled due to back issues with King Diamond.

In March 2008, the At the Pulse of Kapitulation DVD was released, featuring Live in East Berlin and Hallucinative Comas on one disc. Both had previously been available on VHS only and were long out of print. The band had also begun working on their 12th full-length album in late 2007/early 2008 and began recording in July 2008. Recording for the album, dubbed Hordes of Chaos, was wrapped up in late August, with the album being released in January 2009. On 23 January 2009, the band began their "Chaos Over Europe" tour in Tilburg (the Netherlands) with Caliban, Eluveitie and Emergency Gate as other acts. In April 2009, the band embarked on a North American headlining tour, co-headlined by Exodus, and featuring Belphegor, Warbringer, and Epicurean. In late 2009, Reil was forced to sit out some tour dates due to personal issues, with Marco Minnemann temporarily taking his place.

Phantom Antichrist and Gods of Violence (2010–2017)
Kreator signed with Nuclear Blast in early 2010, before embarking on a North American tour in March to celebrate their 25th anniversary. A European tour with Exodus, Death Angel and Suicidal Angels, called "Thrashfest", took place in late 2010. On 1 June 2012, they released their thirteenth studio album, titled Phantom Antichrist. Kreator co-headlined a 23 date North American tour that fall with Nuclear Blast labelmates Accept. Entitled the Teutonic Terror Attack 2012 Tour, they were supported by Finland's Swallow the Sun. Kreator performed alongside Suidakra in Bangalore on 16 June 2012.

Kreator released a music video for "Civilization Collapse" on 28 November 2012.

In a November 2013 interview, Mille Petrozza stated that Kreator would begin work on their fourteenth studio album after the Phantom Antichrist tour for a 2016 release. However, Petrozza said that the album would not be released until 2017. On 30 August that year, they released a two-disc live album called Dying Alive. It contained 24 tracks recorded at Turbinehalle in Oberhausen, Germany. On 14 October 2016, it was announced that Kreator's fourteenth studio album would be called Gods of Violence, and it was released on 27 January 2017. A music video for the album's title track was released on 18 November 2016. Gods of Violence received generally positive reviews, and was their first album to reach number one on the German charts. To promote the album, Kreator embarked on a headlining European tour in February and March 2017, with support from Sepultura, Soilwork and Aborted, and co-headlined the Decibel Magazine tour with Obituary in March and April. In late April, the band announced an Australian tour with Vader, which took place in September. They embarked on two tours in 2018: one in Europe with Decapitated and Dagoba in January, followed by a co-headlining U.S. tour with Sabaton in February and March.

Split with Christian Giesler and Hate Über Alles (2018–present)

About three months after the release of Gods of Violence, Petrozza mentioned a follow-up album, saying, "Maybe we should work with a different producer. Maybe we should go to a different country to record the album. Maybe we should write a more metal or more full-on thrash metal. Whatever we feel, first and foremost, that is the most important thing. Time will tell." In a September 2017 interview with Australia's Silver Tiger Media, Petrozza stated that Kreator could do another album after Gods of Violence but "not yet." When asked in February 2018 about the band's future, Petrozza said, "I think we're gonna take next year off and write a new record. That's the plan at least. We'll see what happens. I don't put myself under pressure. Let's see how I feel after this tour, and if I have ideas for new music, I will book a studio and start working on demos as soon as I have the time. And then I'll come up with some new stuff." He told Guitar Interactive magazine in July 2018 that Kreator would take 2019 off to focus on writing the new album, which was planned for release in the summer of 2020. Petrozza later stated their new album was not expected to be released until the summer of 2021.

In the beginning of December, Kreator embarked on a tour of Europe, entitled the European Apocalypse, with the bands Dimmu Borgir, Hatebreed and Bloodbath. It was also announced that the final concert of the European Apocalypse in London would be filmed and produced as a live DVD in 2019; titled London Apocalypticon - Live at the Roundhouse, this DVD was released on 14 February 2020. Kreator supported Slayer on their final world tour, appearing at the Santiago Gets Louder festival in Chile on 6 October 2019, along with Anthrax and Pentagram Chile.

On 16 September 2019, it was announced that Christian "Speesy" Giesler had left Kreator after 25 years as their bassist, and was replaced by Frédéric Leclercq, who had recently left DragonForce.

On 26 March 2020, Kreator released a music video for "666 - World Divided", which marked their first song in three years and their first one since Leclercq joined the band.

On 20 July 2020, Petrozza posted a picture of himself in the studio on his Instagram page, which indicated that Kreator were working on their new album. Petrozza confirmed two months later that Kreator had been writing new material "in the last couple of months", and that he was recording vocals for the album. In a March 2021 interview, Petrozza revealed that Kreator was supposed to start recording their new album in February, but added that this plan was interrupted by the COVID-19 pandemic. He also went on to say that he wants "the album to come out and go on a world tour right afterwards" and revealed that Arthur Rizk would produce it. The band announced in September 2021 that they had begun recording the album at Hansa Tonstudio in Berlin, Germany with Rizk. In December 2021, Mille announced on his Instagram page that their new album would be released in the summer of 2022, preceded by a "new single SOON!". On 4 February 2022 the band released the title track from Hate Über Alles as the album's first single, and announced on the same day that the album would be released on 3 June; its release date was later pushed back to 10 June. A video for the second single from Hate Über Alles, "Strongest of the Strong", was released on 8 April 2022, followed less than a month later by its third single "Midnight Sun".

Kreator promoted Hate Über Alles with a world tour, including supporting Mercyful Fate on their first North American tour in over 20 years, and touring Europe with Lamb of God and Municipal Waste, during the winter of 2023. They will also co-headline the Klash of the Titans tour throughout the spring of 2023, first in Latin America with Testament, and then in North America with Sepultura.

Musical style and influences
Kreator's musical style is similar to that of their compatriots Destruction, Sodom and Tankard, which is usually more complex and, since Violent Revolution (2001), more melodic. Along with those three bands, Kreator has been referred to as one of the "Big Four" of Teutonic thrash metal, and they are often credited with helping pioneer death metal and black metal by containing several elements of what was to become those genres. The band's style has changed several times over the years, from a Venom-inspired speed metal sound, later moving into thrash metal, and including a period of transitioning from thrash to industrial metal and gothic metal throughout the 1990s. In the early 2000s, Kreator returned to their classic thrash sound, which has continued to the present.

Kreator has been influenced by a variety of music such as post-punk bands like Siouxsie and the Banshees, hardcore punk bands like Bad Religion, D.R.I., the Exploited, GBH and Raw Power, and 1970s and 1980s hard rock and heavy metal bands including Accept, Bathory, Black Sabbath, Iron Maiden, Judas Priest, Kiss, Mercyful Fate, Metallica, Motörhead, Possessed, Raven, Rush, Slayer and Venom.

Band members
Current members
 Miland "Mille" Petrozza – lead vocals, rhythm guitar (1982–present), lead guitar (1982–1986)
 Jürgen "Ventor" Reil – drums (1982–1994, 1996–present), co-lead vocals (1982–1989)
 Sami Yli-Sirniö – lead guitar, backing vocals (2001–present)
 Frédéric Leclercq – bass, backing vocals (2019–present)

Former members
 Roberto "Rob" Fioretti – bass (1982–1992)
 Jörg "Tritze" Trzebiatowski – lead guitar (1986–1989)
 Frank "Blackfire" Gosdzik – lead guitar (1989–1996)
 Andreas Herz – bass (1992–1994)
 Christian "Speesy" Giesler – bass, backing vocals (1994–2019)
 Joe Cangelosi – drums (1994–1996)
 Tommy Vetterli – lead guitar (1996–2001)

Former touring musicians
 Michael Wulf – lead guitar (1986; died 1993)
 Bogusz Rutkiewicz – bass (1988)
 Markus "Makka" Freiwald - drums (2000)
 Marco Minnemann – drums (2009)

Timeline

Discography

Endless Pain (1985)
Pleasure to Kill (1986)
Terrible Certainty (1987)
Extreme Aggression (1989)
Coma of Souls (1990)
Renewal (1992)
Cause for Conflict (1995)
Outcast (1997)
Endorama (1999)
Violent Revolution (2001)
Enemy of God (2005)
Hordes of Chaos (2009)
Phantom Antichrist (2012)
Gods of Violence (2017)
Hate Über Alles (2022)

References

External links

 
 
 

 
1982 establishments in Germany
Epic Records artists
Essen
German thrash metal musical groups
GUN Records artists
Musical groups established in 1982
Musical quartets
Noise Records artists
Nuclear Blast artists
Political music groups
Steamhammer Records artists